James Scanlon (born 26 January 1948) is an Australian equestrian. He competed in two events at the 1968 Summer Olympics.

References

1948 births
Living people
Australian male equestrians
Olympic equestrians of Australia
Equestrians at the 1968 Summer Olympics
Sportspeople from Melbourne